The 1998 Carlisle City Council election took place on 7 May 1998 to elect members of Carlisle District Council in Cumbria, England. One third of the council was up for election and the Labour Party stayed in overall control of the council.

After the election, the composition of the council was:
Labour 33
Conservative 14
Liberal Democrats 3
Independent 1

Election result

References

1998 English local elections
1998
1990s in Cumbria